HMS Burges (K347) was a , built in the United States as a , and transferred to the Royal Navy under the terms of Lend-Lease, which served in World War II.

The name Burges was originally assigned to the Evarts-class destroyer escort, BDE-16, laid down on 14 March 1942. When that ship was retained by the United States Navy and renamed , the name was transferred to another ship.

The new Burges (BDE-12) was laid down on 8 December 1942 by the Boston Navy Yard, and launched on 26 January 1943. The ship was transferred to the Royal Navy on 2 June 1943 and commissioned the same day.

Service history
Operating as a Royal Navy ship, Burges served in the Atlantic in late 1943 and early 1944. In 1944, she moved to a zone of operations in the North Sea. The last months of World War II saw her active in the English Channel.

The destroyer escort was returned to the United States Navy at New York on 27 February 1946. She was determined to be surplus to the needs of the Navy, and her name was struck from the Navy List on 28 March 1946. In November 1946, she was sold to George H. Nutman, Inc., of Brooklyn, N.Y. She was scrapped on 31 July 1947.

References

External links
 

Captain-class frigates
Evarts-class destroyer escorts
World War II frigates of the United Kingdom
Ships built in Boston
1942 ships
Ships transferred from the United States Navy to the Royal Navy